Wayne Wallingford (born July 11, 1946) is an American politician who previously served as a member of the Missouri House of Representatives from the 147th district. He previously served as a member of the Missouri Senate from 2013 to 2021.

Career

Missouri Department of Revenue
In January 2022, Wallingford became the new director of the Missouri Department of Revenue. Governor Mike Parson announced Wallingford's appointment in December 2021.

Education
Wallingford is a member of Governor Mike Parson's commission on workforce development.

Families and children
In 2016 and 2017, Wallingford proposed legislation to established a rebuttable presumption of shared parenting after divorce. Wallingford has asserted that most fatherlessness is created by an outdated court system, not abandonment, and that it is in the best interest of a child to have both parents. Neither bill was voted upon. In 2019, Wallingford reintroduced a similar bill (SB.14). After passing the Seniors, Families and Children Committee, it is waiting to be voted on by the full senate.

Transportation
Wallingford has sponsored legislation to ban texting while driving in Missouri.

Electoral history

State Representative

State Senate

References

Living people
Republican Party members of the Missouri House of Representatives
1946 births
21st-century American politicians